Slanec is a village and municipality in Košice-okolie District in the Košice Region of eastern Slovakia.

History
In historical records the village was first mentioned in 1230 (Castrum Salis) as an important fortress. In 1270 King Stephen V of Hungary gave the castle to Master Reinhold. The new lords of Slanec supported King Přemysl Otakar II against King Ladislav in the conquest of the Bohemian throne. King Ladislav conquered Slanec in 1281. In 1299 the castle passed to the Szalanczyi noble family and, successively to landowners by the surnames of Lossonczy and Forgách. In 1649 it was besieged by the rebel condottiere György Rákoczi.

Geography
The village lies at an altitude of 345 metres and covers an area of 20.459 km². The municipality has a population of about 1310 people.

Transportation
The village has a railway station.

External links
Stats
Info

Villages and municipalities in Košice-okolie District